The Washington D.C. Area Film Critics Association Award for Best Animated Feature is an annual award given out by the Washington D.C. Area Film Critics Association. Toy Story is the only franchise with multiple wins, winning two times for Toy Story 3 (2010) and Toy Story 4 (2019).

Winners and nominees

2000s

2010s

2020s

See also
Academy Award for Best Animated Feature

References

Animated Feature, Best
Awards for best animated feature film